The 1908 Rock Island Independents season was their second season in existence. The team finished with a perfect 4–0 record.

Schedule

References

Rock Island Independents seasons
Rock Island
Rock Island